The University Athletic Association of the Philippines Season 74 basketball tournaments are the basketball events of UAAP's 2011-12 season. Ateneo de Manila University was the season host. The season started with an Olympic-style opening ceremony on July 9, 2011 and followed by a doubleheader basketball games on July 10 at the Araneta Coliseum.

The UAAP named former Philippine Basketball League (PBL) commissioner, current Rain or Shine Elasto Painters team consultant and Philippine Basketball Association (PBA) TV commentator Andy Jao as commissioner for basketball. Jao is considering on recommending to the UAAP board on hiring referees from the Samahang Basketbol ng Pilipinas (SBP).

The game schedules were changed. Instead of the usual 2 p.m. and 4 p.m. schedules, game time were moved to 1 p.m. and 3 p.m. so that students can go home earlier and that basketball fans can also get to watch the PBA games which usually start at 5:30 p.m.

The eligibility of two players, Ray Parks and Greg Slaughter, were scrutinized by the UAAP Eligibility Committee. Parks of NU studied high school in the United States of America while Slaughter of Ateneo played with the Smart Gilas national team in the 2011 PBA Commissioner's Cup while serving residency.

At the eligibility meeting, Parks' and Slaughter's eligibilities were questioned. Parks had already undergone a one-year residency but the committee says that he has to do a two-year residency as he studied abroad. Ateneo's Ricky Palou, also UAAP President, said that Slaughter's appearance with Smart Gilas was not an issue.

Slaughter's eligibility was cleared by the Eligibility Committee, pending approval by the UAAP Board. Meanwhile, Parks did not get a recommendation as additional documents were required by the Eligibility Committee.

NU officials issued a statement that Parks has met all eligibility requirements and should be allowed play. NU athletic director Junel Baculi mentioned exceptions to the two-year redshirt rule when a player's parents were assigned abroad due to the nature of their jobs and children whose parents are overseas Filipino workers. Parks, who was born in the Philippines and studied in a local school up to seventh grade, went abroad when his mother took a job in the US where he studied at St. George's up to the 11th grade. He returned to the Philippines with his father in the late 2000s recession.

The UAAP Board eventually cleared both Parks and Slaughter, the former after having presented additional documents.

Another decision the Board had to make was which group of referees would be selected to officiate the games. The Basketball Referees Association for Schools, Colleges and Universities (BRASCU) and the referees from the SBP were the two organizations that were being chosen by the UAAP board.

Final Four Recap
The Ateneo Blue Eagles finished on top of the elimination round standings although they were denied a 14–0 sweep by the Adamson Falcons, which clinched the #2 seed. The FEU Tamaraws faced the Falcons in the semifinals, in a series that went into two games. The Tamaraws were on their way of eliminating Adamson but the Falcons managed to cut FEU's double-digit lead but the Tamaraws held on to win. The Eagles met the UST Growling Tigers in the other semifinal series, with the Tigers reducing Ateneo's double-digit lead to a single basket but were denied in their last possession. In a rematch of the 2010 Finals where Ateneo won, the Eagles swept the Finals series 2–0 against the Tamaraws, with Nico Salva being named the Finals MVP. Ateneo won its fourth consecutive championship in Men's Basketball.

In the Juniors' tournament, the FEU-FERN Baby Tamaraws clinched the #1 seed after winning 12 consecutive games; their only loss against Ateneo at their second game. The Baby Tamaraws faced the Blue Eaglets in the semifinals, where Ateneo forced a deciding game; FEU-FERN won on the second game to advance to the Finals. The De La Salle Zobel Junior Archers, which won their first eight games, lost to FEU, NU and Ateneo in the second round to finish second. They met the NU Bullpups in the semifinals, which won in the first game. The Bullpups hanged on for a three-point win to clinch a Finals berth. The Baby Tamaraws won Game 1 in overtime, but the Bullpups won their school's first juniors' basketball title since 1974 by winning the last two games. Ralph Atangan was named the Finals MVP.

Last season's runner-up FEU Lady Tamaraws finished first after the elimination round and faced the De La Salle Lady Archers in the semifinals. DLSU forced a rubber match with a three-point win but FEU scored a 22-point blowout in the second game to advance to the Finals. The UST Tigresses, which had won all first round games, were tied by Adamson and DLSU at the end of the eliminations. With DLSU emerging as the team with lowest quotient, UST and Adamson played off for the #2 seed, a game where the Lady Falcons won convincingly. The Lady Falcons had another convincing win against the Tigresses in the semifinals to arrange a Finals rematch against FEU. The Lady Falcons took Game 1 with a 4-point win, but FEU won Game 2 with a 22-point margin; FEU won the deciding game via an 11-point victory. Allana Lim was awarded Finals MVP.

Men's tournament

Teams

Coaching changes

Elimination round

Team standings

Match-up results

Results

Bracket

Semifinals

Ateneo vs. UST

Adamson vs. FEU

Finals

 Finals Most Valuable Player: 

Note: Due to typhoon Pedring, Game 2 was suspended and rescheduled to October 1, 2011.

Awards

 Most Valuable Player: 
 Rookie of the Year: 
 Mythical Five:
 
 
 
 
 
 Champ of the Season: 
 Maaasahan Player of the Year: 
 Most Improved Player of the Season:

Women's tournament

Elimination round

Team standings

Match-up results

Results

Second–seed playoff

Bracket

Semifinals

FEU vs. La Salle

Adamson vs. UST

Finals

 Finals Most Valuable Player: 
Studio 23 aired Games 2 and 3 on October 20 and 21.

Awards

 Most Valuable Player: 
 Rookie of the Year:

Juniors' tournament

Elimination round

Team standings

Schedule

Results

Bracket

Semifinals

FEU-FERN vs. Ateneo

DLSZ vs. NU

Finals

 Finals Most Valuable Player: 
Studio 23 aired Games 2 and 3 on October 20 and 21.

Awards

 Most Valuable Player: 
 Rookie of the Year:

References

See also
NCAA Season 87 basketball tournaments

74
2011–12 in Philippine college basketball
Basket